Virginia Manor, also known as Glengyle, is a historic home located in Natural Bridge Station, Rockbridge County, Virginia. The original section was built about 1800. The house consists of a two-story center block with a one-story wing on each side and a two-story rear ell.  The two-story, five-bay frame central section expanded the original log structure in 1856. Between 1897 and 1920, two one-story, one-room wings with bay windows were added to the east and west sides of the 1850s house. The property also includes a contributing two-story playhouse, a tenants' house, a stable, a spring house, a brick storage building, a smokehouse, a barn, a railroad waiting station, a dam, and a boatlock. The property was the summer home of George Stevens, president of the Chesapeake and Ohio Railroad from 1900 to 1920.

It was listed on the National Register of Historic Places in 1987.

References

Houses on the National Register of Historic Places in Virginia
Houses completed in 1856
Houses in Rockbridge County, Virginia
National Register of Historic Places in Rockbridge County, Virginia
1856 establishments in Virginia